Nicolao Civitali (1482 - after 1560) was an Italian Renaissance sculptor and architect, active in his native Lucca. He was the son of the sculptor Matteo. His son, Vincenzo Civitali, was also a local engineer and architect.

References

Italian Renaissance architects
Italian Renaissance sculptors
1482 births
1560 deaths
Architects from Lucca
Artists from Lucca
16th-century Italian architects
16th-century Italian sculptors
Italian male sculptors